Struck by Lightning is a 1990 Australian film directed by Jerzy Domaradzki. The film was nominated in 4 AFI Award categories, including Best Director and Best Film. It won the film award at the Human Rights Medal and Awards in 1990.

Plot summary

Garry McDonald plays Ollie, a grumpy alcoholic workshop supervisor at a shelter called Saltmarsh. He hires Pat (Brian Vriends), a school teacher, to develop an experimental fitness program for the intellectually disabled young adults in the shelter. Pat teaches P.E and decides to try to get them involved in soccer, with some interesting results. Jill is Ollie's social worker, who Ollie calls 'the bitch'.

Cast
Garry McDonald as Ollie Rennie
Brian Vriends as Pat Cannizzaro
Catherine McClements as Jill McHugh
Gary George as Gary
Henry Salter as Noel
Denis Moore as Foster
Briony Williams as Gail
Syd Brisbane as Spencer
Brian M. Logan as Kevin
Jon Fabian as Vince Cannizzaro

Production
In February 1989 Jerzy Domaradzki was working with writer Trevor Farrant on another script when Farrant gave him the screenplay for Struck by Lightning. The director loved it, Terry Charatsis applied for funding to the Film Finance Corporation and managed to get the film up. It was shot in November 1989 in Adelaide.

Reception
Critics' reception was generally positive to glowing ("charming and exhilarating black comedy, marvellously acted by the whole cast."), but the Australian audience stayed away, perhaps deterred by its "improving" nature, and abetted by low-key promotion and hesitant distribution. It has been played on free-to-air TV a few times.
There was a limited VHS, but to date no DVD, release.

See also
Cinema of Australia

References

External links

Struck by Lightning at Oz Movies

1990 films
Australian drama films
Films shot in Adelaide
1990 drama films
Down syndrome in film
1990s English-language films
1990s Australian films